Fabian Franke (born March 7, 1989) is a German footballer who plays as a central defender for SSV Markranstädt.

External links

1989 births
Living people
German footballers
Hamburger SV II players
RB Leipzig players
SV Wehen Wiesbaden players
Hallescher FC players
SSV Markranstädt players
3. Liga players
Association football central defenders
Footballers from Leipzig
21st-century German people